Vishwakarma University is located in Pune, Maharashtra, India.

History
The Vishwakarma University was established on 3 May 2017 as a State Private University by the Government of Maharashtra. The university enjoys an autonomy in designing its own curriculum, teaching methods, examination system and awarding degrees as per the provisions of Vishwakarma University Act 2017. The academic programs commenced from June 2017.

Campus
Vishwakarma University has a campus located in Kondwa, suburbs of Pune city in Maharashtra, India. It is 10 km from Pune station and 17 km from Pune airport.

Organisation
The Vishwakarma University is a natural offshoot of the Vishwakarma Group's educational legacy spanning 35 years. The Group functions under the framework of Bansilal Ramnath Agarwal Charitable Trust(BRACT). The Trust runs several educational institutes, a publishing division, retail stores, a managing consultancy and a temple under its aegis.

The first educational venture of the trust - Vishwakarma Institute of Technology (VIT) was established in the year 1983. Vishwakarma Vidyalaya was established in the year 1986, followed by a series of educational institutes in the subsequent years. Presently, the Vishwakarma Group has 1500 full-time employees, 17 educational institutes that have programmes ranging from high school, junior school, undergraduate, postgraduate to Phd. Programmes, in the fields of engineering, law, management, marine engineering, and value added programmes with approximately 17,000 student enrollments.

Departments/ Centers

Art and Design -
 Department of Fashion and Apparel
 Department of Graphic and Multimedia
 Department of Interior Design and Decoration
 Department of Fashion Design and Apparel Technology
 Department of Graphic Design and Multimedia Technology
 Department of Interior Design and Decoration Technology

Science and Technology -
 Department of Mechanical Engineering
 Department of Computer Engineering
 Department of Artificial Intelligence and Data Sciences

Centre for Professional Excellence in Engineering -
 Centre for Professional Excellence 4.0
 Department of Mathematics and Statistics
 Department of Basic Science
 Department of Biotech and Bioinformatics
 Department of Computer Science
 Department of Health and Wellness

Commerce and Management -
 Department of Business Administration 
 Department of Commerce

Interdisciplinary Studies -
 Department of Vocational Education
 Department of Professional Education

Humanities and Social Science -
 Department of Psychology
 Department of Economics
 Department of Public Administration
 Department of Foreign Languages
 Department of Philosophy and Culture
 Department of Liberal Arts
 Department of Travel and Tourism

Journalism and Mass Communication -
 Department of Media, Communication and Journalism

Law -
 Department of Law and Governance

Associations
 IBM
 TATA Technologies
 Korean Institute of Science and Technology
 State University of New York, Binghamton, U.S.A.
 National University, U.S.A.
 The University of Ngaoundere, Cameroon
 Wufeng University, Taiwan
 University of Ontario, Canada
 Hof University of Applied Sciences, Germany
 Energy Research Institute @ NTU, Singapore
 Unity Engine
 School of Integrated Innovation, Chulalongkorn University, Thailand

Achievements

Vishwakarma University was awarded the best Innovations Award by ACMA-LIONS at Innovations Expo 2017.

Vishwakarma University won award for best guitarist in Firodiya karandak 2022.

Extra-Curricular

Activities like photography, literary readings and sports are an integral part of the life at Vishwakarma University campus. The university has a vibrant photography club, a book club, an adventure club, a fine arts club, cultural club, an Ethical and Social Responsibility club (ECR) and a sports club to bring out the non-academic potentials of students to the fore.

References

External links

Universities in Maharashtra
Universities and colleges in Pune
Educational institutions established in 2017
2017 establishments in Maharashtra